Common names: Transvaal quill-snouted snake,  Speckled quill-snouted snake

Xenocalamus transvaalensis is a species of venomous rear-fanged snake in the family Atractaspididae. The species is endemic to Africa. There are no subspecies that are recognized as being valid.

Geographic range
X. transvaalensis is found in Botswana, southern Mozambique, Republic of South Africa (former Northern Transvaal and former Zululand), and Zimbabwe.

Description
X. transvaalensis is black dorsally, and white ventrally.

Reproduction
In summer an adult female X. transvaalensis may lay two elongated eggs, 28 mm x 6 mm (1 1/16 in x 3/16 in).

References

Further reading
Methuen PA (1919). "Descriptions of a new snake from the Transvaal, together with a new diagnosis and key of the genus Xenocalamus, and of some Batrachia from Madagascar". Proc. Zool. Soc. London 1919: 349–355. (Xenocalamus transvaalensis, new species).

External Links
 iNaturalist page

Atractaspididae
Reptiles described in 1919
Taxonomy articles created by Polbot